"(Ghost) Riders in the Sky: A Cowboy Legend" is a cowboy-styled country/western song written in 1948 by American songwriter, film and television actor Stan Jones.

A number of versions were crossover hits on the pop charts in 1949, the most successful being by Vaughn Monroe. The ASCAP database lists the song as "Riders in the Sky" (title code 480028324), but the title has been written as "Ghost Riders", "Ghost Riders in the Sky", and "A Cowboy Legend". Members of the Western Writers of America chose it as the greatest Western song of all time.

Overview
The song tells a folk tale of a cowboy who has a vision of red-eyed, steel-hooved cattle thundering across the sky, being chased by the spirits of damned cowboys. One warns him that if he does not change his ways, he will be doomed to join them, forever "trying to catch the Devil's herd across these endless skies".  The story has been linked with old European myths of the Wild Hunt and the Dutch/Flemish legend of the Buckriders, in which a supernatural group of hunters passes the narrator in wild pursuit.

Stan Jones stated that he had been told the story when he was 12 years old by an old Native American who resided north-east of the Douglas, Arizona border town, a few miles behind D Hill, north of Agua Prieta, Sonora. The Native Americans, possibly Apache, who lived within Cochise County, believed that when souls vacate their physical bodies, they reside as spirits in the sky, resembling ghost riders. He related this story to Wayne Hester, a boyhood friend (later owner of the Douglas Cable Company). As both boys were looking at the clouds, Stan shared what the old Native American had told him, looking in amazement as the cloudy shapes were identified as the "ghost riders" that years later, would be transposed into lyrics. The melody is based on the Civil War-era popular song "When Johnny Comes Marching Home".

Hundreds of performers have recorded versions of the song.  Vaughn Monroe reached number 1 in Billboard magazine with his version ("Riders in the Sky" with orchestra and vocal quartet). Other artists that made the charts with the song include The Outlaws, Bing Crosby (with the Ken Darby Singers), Frankie Laine, Burl Ives (two different versions), Marty Robbins, The Ramrods and Johnny Cash.

Notable and charting recordings
 The original version by Stan Jones was recorded in late 1948 or early 1949. A recording by Stan Jones and his Death Valley Rangers was issued on Mercury 5320 in May 1949. Fellow songwriter Eden Ahbez sent the song to Burl Ives, who recorded his own version in early 1949.
 Burl Ives recorded the song on February 17, 1949, and the song was released by Columbia Records as catalog No. 38445. The recording first appeared on the Billboard charts on April 22, 1949, lasting six weeks and peaking at No. 21.
 The version by Vaughn Monroe and His Orchestra with Vaughn Monroe and The Moon Men on vocals, was recorded on March 14, 1949, and released by RCA Victor Records as catalog No. 20-3411 (in USA) and by EMI on the His Master's Voice label as catalog No. BD 1247, HN 3014, HQ 2071, IM 1425 and GY 878. The recording first appeared on the Billboard charts on April 15, 1949, lasting 22 weeks and reaching No. 1. Billboard ranked it as the No. 1 song for 1949.
 The Bing Crosby version was recorded on March 22, 1949, and released by Decca Records as catalog No. 24618. The recording first appeared on the Billboard charts on May 6, 1949, lasting 6 weeks and peaking at No. 14.
 The Peggy Lee version was recorded on April 18, 1949, and released by Capitol Records as catalog No. 57-608. It reached No. 2 on Billboards Most Played By Disc Jockeys listing without appearing in the retail Top 30.
 The Ramrods released an instrumental rock version in 1961 with eerie and evocative overdubbed shouts, whistles and cattle calls. The record was made a "Pick of the Week" by Cash Box, and rose to No. 30 on the Billboard Hot 100 chart and No. 8 on the UK singles chart.
 Lawrence Welk and His Orchestra released an instrumental version in 1961, featuring Neil Levang on guitar, which spent three weeks on the Billboard Hot 100 chart, reaching No. 87.
 The Johnny Cash version, recorded for the album Silver, was released by Columbia Records as catalog No. 3-10961 on April 1, 1979. It first appeared on Billboards Hot Country Singles & Tracks chart on April 15, 1979, lasting 16 weeks and peaking at No. 2 on July 27.
 An instrumental version by the Shadows reached No. 12 on the UK Singles Chart in January 1980.
 The Blues Brothers Band recorded the song as part of the film Blues Brothers 2000.
 Rock band Outlaws made a recording on their 1980 album Ghost Riders that omitted the last verse. This version spent 15 weeks on the Billboard Hot 100, peaking at number 31 in March 1981. This version of the song is used by professional wrestler "Hangman" Adam Page, who first used it at the All Elite Wrestling Revolution pay-per-view event on March 5, 2023.
 Rock band Spiderbait recorded the song as part of the 2007 film Ghost Rider.

References

External links
 Burl Ives - The original recording of Ghost Riders In The Sky
 Riders In The Sky - Vaughn Monroe (1965 concert performance)

Western music (North America)
1948 songs
Number-one singles in the United States
Burl Ives songs
Bing Crosby songs
Gene Autry songs
Johnny Cash songs
Peggy Lee songs
Vaughn Monroe songs
Vic Damone songs
Outlaws (band) songs
Songs about ghosts
Songs about cowboys and cowgirls